Iowa Highway 5 is a highway in southern Iowa. It is the northernmost segment of a three-state "Highway 5" also involving Missouri Route 5 and  Arkansas Highway 5. Portions of the highway are freeway and expressway. It had previously been designated Iowa Highway 60. The southern terminus of Iowa Highway 5 is at the Missouri border southwest of Cincinnati. Its northern terminus is at Interstate 35 at West Des Moines.

Route description
Iowa Highway 5 begins at the Missouri border southwest of Cincinnati.  It passes through Cincinnati, then turns north to go through Centerville, where it intersects Iowa Highway 2.  It continues north through Moravia and intersects U.S. Highway 34 in Albia.  Iowa 5 also intersects Iowa Highway 137 in Albia and turns northwest.  It goes northwest through Lovilia and Hamilton before intersecting Iowa Highway 92 in Knoxville.

Iowa 5 and Iowa 92 then become a freeway bypass of Knoxville, bypassing Knoxville on its south side, intersecting Iowa Highway 14 on the bypass.  After the bypass, Iowa 5 and Iowa 92 become an expressway.  Iowa 5 then separates from Iowa 92 near Pleasantville.  Iowa 5 then turns north, bypasses Pleasantville, and intersects Iowa Highway 316 northwest of Pleasantville.  Iowa 5 continues northwest past Hartford and Carlisle, then intersects U.S. Highway 65.  Iowa 5 then goes west as a freeway with U.S. 65 to an interchange with U.S. Highway 69, where U.S. 65 separates in Des Moines.  Iowa 5 then continues west as a southeastern freeway bypass of Des Moines, intersecting Iowa Highway 28 at Norwalk and ends in West Des Moines at Interstate 35.

History

Primary Road 5 was designated in 1920 connecting Sioux City and Dubuque. In 1926, this route was truncated at Fort Dodge and at Le Mars and subsequently extended to Akron in 1929. This last section of Iowa 5 is now designated Iowa Highway 7.

The current Iowa 5 was designated on January 1, 1969, along the southern portion Iowa Highway 60.  It was renumbered to provide route number continuity with Missouri Route 5.  In 1978, a bypass of Knoxville was opened carrying Iowa 5 and Iowa Highway 92 around the southern edge of Knoxville.

In the Des Moines area, Iowa 5 had the same route along Army Post Road from 1969 until 1997, when sections of a southern bypass, completed in 2002, were opened.

Major intersections

References

External links

The Iowa Highways Page by Jason Hancock

005